Amadegah Shahid Mohammad Montazeri (also Romanized as Āmādegāh Shahīd Moḩammad Montaz̧eri) is a village in Manzariyeh Rural District, in the Central District of Shahreza County, Isfahan Province, Iran. At the 2006 census, its population was 34, in 10 families.

References 

Populated places in Shahreza County